The ADM-160 MALD (Miniature Air-Launched Decoy) is a decoy missile developed by the United States.

Overview

DARPA MALD program
The Miniature Air-Launched Decoy (MALD) program was begun in 1995 by DARPA as an effort to develop a small, low cost decoy missile for use in the Suppression of Enemy Air Defenses. Teledyne Ryan (acquired by Northrop Grumman in 1999) was granted a development contract for the ADM-160A in 1996, and the first test flight took place in 1999. The evaluation program was finished by 2001.

The US Air Force planned to acquire several thousand of ADM-160A's, but in 2001 this was reduced to at most 150 for a System Development and Demonstration (SDD) program. In January 2002, the USAF cancelled the program because the drone didn't have enough range and endurance to meet the service's requirements or to perform other missions.

The ADM-160A carries a Signature Augmentation Subsystem (SAS) which is composed of various active radar enhancers which cover a range of frequencies. The SAS can therefore simulate any aircraft, from the B-52 Stratofortress to the F-117 Nighthawk.

The missile has folded wings to allow more compact carriage. On launch the wings unfold and a TJ-50 turbojet propels the missile on a pre-determined course which is composed of up to 100 different waypoints. An inertial navigation system with GPS support keeps the MALD on course. Although pre-programmed before the aircraft leaves the ground, the course can be modified by the pilot at any point up to launch.

New USAF competition

In 2002, the USAF renewed its interest in an air-launched decoy and started a new industry-wide competition for a variant with greater endurance. The contract for a new MALD was awarded to Raytheon in Spring 2003.

The Raytheon ADM-160B is similar in configuration to the ADM-160A, but has a trapezoidal fuselage cross section and is larger and heavier. It is powered by a Hamilton Sundstrand TJ-150, a more powerful variant of the TJ-50.

The first ADM-160B was delivered in Spring 2009. In 2010 an "operationally significant quantity" of the drones were delivered to the Air Force. The USAF currently plans to procure about 1,500.

In 2008 a contract for a jamming variant MALD-J was awarded to Raytheon. It made its first freefall test in 2009 and passed its critical design review in early 2010. The first MALD-J was delivered to the Air Force on September 6, 2012.  On September 24, Raytheon started operational testing, achieving four successful flights out of four launches. In April 2015, the MALD-J completed operational testing, satisfying all requirements in 42 flight tests over the last two years.

In November 2012, Raytheon completed ground verification tests for the MALD and MALD-J for integration onto the MQ-9 Reaper UAV.  Integration onto the aircraft was expected sometime in 2013, with the goal for an unmanned suppression of enemy air defenses capability. The company has also explored integration onto the smaller MQ-1 Predator and U.S. Army MQ-1C Gray Eagle.

In June 2013, Raytheon completed a four-year development program of the MALD, under budget.  The MALD and MALD-J successfully completed all 30 engineering and operational flight tests, with each version completing 15. The Air Force has cleared the B-model MALD for export.

In May 2014, Raytheon delivered the 1,000th MALD-J to the Air Force as part of the Lot 5 production contract.  The MALD program has achieved a perfect 33-for-33 flight test success record over the past two years.

In December 2014, a MALD-J was test-flown with a radio data-link to expand situational awareness and allow for in-flight targeting adjustments.  While carrying out a jamming mission, the MALD-J was able to send situation awareness data to the EW Battle Manager, which used the information to adjust its mission while in-flight.

In July 2015, Raytheon revealed it had developed a new composite missile body for the MALD-J in partnership with Fokker Aerostructures and Italian race car manufacturer Dallara that is 25 percent cheaper to produce; Fokker adapted robotics to wind the carbon fiber fuselage instead of the conventional manual process and Dallara applied its lightweight structural technologies to airframe accessories such as air inlets and covers.  The new cheaper airframe design was first incorporated into Lot 7 production models in 2015, from the contract awarded in June 2014.

US Navy 
The Naval Surface Warfare Center will place an order for the MALD-J.

Systems integration has been announced as of July 6, 2012, by the Raytheon Corp. for the U.S. Navy's F/A-18E/F Super Hornet.  The process included a series of risk reduction activities and technology demonstrations.

On 9 September 2015, Raytheon and the Naval Research Lab announced they had demonstrated a new rapid-replacement, modular architecture for the MALD-J for electronic warfare payloads. Four payloads, each customized for a specific mission and threat, were demonstrated in 12 captive carry flights; the payloads could be swapped out of a captive carry vehicle in less than one minute.

In July 2016, Raytheon received a contract to develop an evolution of the MALD-J called the MALD-X, incorporating an improved electronic warfare payload, the ability to fly at low-altitude, and an enhanced net-enabled data-link.  The company hopes to transition the MALD-X into the MALD-N for the U.S. Navy.

British interest 
The British Ministry of Defence expressed interest on the MALD-V platform at the Paris Airshow in 2009.

Variants

   Original decoy version developed by Teledyne Ryan (acquired by Northrop Grumman) and funded by DARPA. It uses GPS-aided navigation system, and can fly missions with up to 256 predefined waypoints. The mission profile is preprogrammed, but can be redefined by the pilot of the launching aircraft until immediately before launch.

   Decoy version developed by Raytheon with longer endurance. In use by the USAF.

  "MALD-J"  Radar jammer variant of ADM-160B by Raytheon.  This variant of the MALD decoy will be able to operate in both decoy and jammer modes. The decoy and jammer configurations are key enablers supporting the Air Force Global Strike, Global Response, Space and C4ISR, and the Air and Space Expeditionary Force Concepts of Operations. MALD-J will provide stand-in jamming capability for the Airborne Electronic Attack Systems of Systems. It will be launched against a preplanned target and jam specific radars in a stand-in role to degrade or deny the IADS detection of friendly aircraft or munitions. Delivery to the US Armed Forces is to begin in 2012. That year, the Air Force ended procurement of the ADM-160B and will only procure MALD-J versions.

Experimental variants
 MALI  The  is an armed version of the ADM-160A which could be used against cruise missiles. It has a more powerful engine and a more aerodynamic shape for supersonic flight, and can be updated in mid flight via a command link to aircraft such as the E-3 Sentry AWACS.  It completed its development program in 2002.

  Modular payload version that provides space for mission specific payloads of surveillance gear, radio/radar/infrared jammers or other equipment. This may provide the go-forward architecture, and give the option of turning MALD into a UAV, or even a combination killer-UAV/decoy. If equipped with sensor payloads, the MALD may be modified to be recovered so as not to lose valuable payloads after each flight. One payload option could be a thermobaric warhead, essentially turning the MALD into a cruise missile.

Launch platforms
Current:
F-16 Fighting Falcon
B-52 Stratofortress
Future and potential:
F/A-18 Super Hornet
C-130 Hercules
C-17 Globemaster III
V-22 Osprey
AV-8B Harrier II
Eurofighter Typhoon
A-10C Warthog
MQ-1 Predator
MQ-1C Gray Eagle
MQ-9 Reaper
Gripen E

Specifications (Northrop Grumman ADM-160A)

Length : 2.38 m (7 ft 10 in)
Wingspan : 0.65 m (2 ft 2 in)
Diameter : 15 cm (6 in)
Weight : 45 kg (100 lb)
Speed : Mach 0.8
Ceiling : Over 9,000 m (30,000 ft)
Range : Over 460 km (285 mi)
Endurance : Over 20 min
Propulsion : Hamilton Sundstrand TJ-50 turbojet; 220 N (50 lbf) thrust
Unit cost : US$30,000

Specifications (Raytheon ADM-160B)

Length : 2.84 m (9 ft 7 in)
Wingspan : 1.71 m (5 ft 7 in) fully extended
Weight : 115 kg (250 lb)
Speed : Mach 0.91
Ceiling : Over 12,200 m (40,000 ft)
Range : Approximately 920 km (575 mi) with ability to loiter over target
Endurance : Over 45 min at altitude
Propulsion : Hamilton Sundstrand TJ-150 turbojet 
Unit cost : US$120,000 (initial), US$322,000 (as of 2015)

See also

List of missiles
ADM-141 TALD

References

This article contains material that originally came from the web article Unmanned Aerial Vehicles by Greg Goebel, which exists in the Public Domain.

  

Decoy missiles of the United States
DARPA projects
Military equipment introduced in the 2010s